Beni Saf is a town in northwestern Algeria, about 80 kilometers southwest of Oran. The town was founded in 1876 as a shipping port for iron ore, which is mined just south of the town. Other products of the town include zinc, marble and onyx, and the fishing industry is extensive.

Sources 

Communes of Aïn Témouchent Province